Moon Sook is a South Korean actress. She is known for her roles in dramas such as Tunnel, The Uncanny Counter, Matrimonial Chaos, Kkondae Intern and Lovers of the Red Sky. She also appeared in the movies Keys to the Heart, Svaha: The Sixth Finger, Shades of the Heart and Emergency Declaration. In the 1970s she was called the Audrey Hepburn of Korea due to her resemblance to the actress.

Personal life 
Moon married director Lee Man-hee in 1974 who was 23 years older then her and already married. The marriage did not last long due to Lee Man-hee's death in 1975. Actress Lee Hye-young is her step-daughter. She later moved to America to study painting, Where she met and married an American man with whom she has two children.

Filmography

Television series

Film

Awards and nominations

References

External links 
 
 

1954 births
20th-century South Korean actresses
Living people
People from Yangju
21st-century South Korean actresses
South Korean television actresses
South Korean film actresses